The AWA Midwest Heavyweight Championship was a title in the late 1960s and early 1970s in the American Wrestling Association. It was primarily defended in the Omaha, Nebraska area and was a title for mid-level wrestlers.

Title history

Footnotes

References

American Wrestling Association championships
Heavyweight wrestling championships
United States regional professional wrestling championships